Kiss FM or Radio Kiss is a Bosnian commercial radio station, broadcasting from Kiseljak, Bosnia and Herzegovina.

The station focuses on contemporary pop music. Until 7 December 2017, a radio station was called Radio Kiseljak.

Four internet radio stations Kiss PARTY, Kiss Dance, Kiss Love and Kiss Cafe are also part of company.

Frequencies
The program is currently broadcast at 4 frequencies in Central Bosnia:
 Kiseljak  
 Kreševo  
 Nova Bila 
 Gornji Vakuf 
 Mostar

References

External links 
 www.kissfm.ba
 Communications Regulatory Agency of Bosnia and Herzegovina
 Kiss FM page on Facebook

See also 
List of radio stations in Bosnia and Herzegovina

Kiseljak
Radio stations established in 2017